Estanislau Amadeu Kreutz (July 1, 1928 – July 6, 2014) was a Catholic bishop.

Ordained to the priesthood in 1954, Kreutz was named titular bishop of Maranana and auxiliary bishop of the Catholic Diocese of Santo Angelo, Brazil in 1972. In 1973, he was named diocesan bishop of the Santo Angelo Diocese and retired in 2004.

Notes

1928 births
2014 deaths
20th-century Roman Catholic bishops in Brazil
Brazilian people of German descent
21st-century Roman Catholic bishops in Brazil
Roman Catholic bishops of Santo Ângelo